Edik is a given name. Notable people with the name include:

 Edik Baghdasaryan, Armenian journalist
 Edik Korchagin (born 1979), Russian footballer
 Edik Sajaia (born 1981), Georgian footballer

Masculine given names